Katelyn Ayers (born 9 February 1995) is a Canadian long-distance runner. In 2019, she competed in the senior women's race at the 2019 IAAF World Cross Country Championships held in Aarhus, Denmark. She finished in 57th place.

In 2019, she competed at the 2019 NACAC Cross Country Championships held in Port of Spain, Trinidad and Tobago. She finished in 9th place in the women's individual event.

References

External links 
 

Living people
1995 births
Place of birth missing (living people)
Canadian female long-distance runners
Canadian female cross country runners
20th-century Canadian women
21st-century Canadian women